Alna is a borough of Oslo, Norway.

Alna may also refer to:

Places
 Alna, Maine, a town in the US
 Alna River, a river in Oslo, Norway
 Łyna (river) (Alna in Lithuanian), a river in Poland and the Kaliningrad Oblast of Russia

Other
 Alna's, a motto used by musician Alberto Naranjo
 , a Japanese rolling stock and tram manufacturer

See also